María Concepción Hidalgo (13 December 1923 – 30 November 2019), was a Spanish actress, better known in TV series like Aída, La que se avecina, El internado, Hospital Central, Águila Roja and the awarded films Goya's Ghosts, Matador, Voyage to Nowhere.

References 

1923 births
2019 deaths
Spanish film actresses
Spanish television actresses
People from Melilla